Gareth John Stewart (born 3 February 1980) is an English footballer who is a coach for AFC Bournemouth as a first-team goalkeeping coach.

Stewart started his professional career with Blackburn Rovers in 1997 representing England various times at a young age, but left for AFC Bournemouth in 1999 having never made an appearance for Blackburn. He established himself as Bournemouth's number one goalkeeper during the 2000–01 season, only to be dislodged during the 2002–03 season. Having been the club's number one goalkeeper again during the 2005–06 season, he played less regularly in the next two seasons, and was released by Bournemouth in 2008, having made 179 appearances for the club. He then switched to Conference South side Dorchester Town, making 47 appearances before briefly leaving competitive football. He joined Conference South side Welling United in 2010, and made 12 appearances before joining Yeovil Town as a player/goalkeeping coach. Now, being promoted to assistant first team goalkeeping coach alongside Neil Moss, Stewart follows club plans to achieve premier league status once more and continue Bournemouth's well known goalkeeping department producing careers for many goalkeepers. Aiming to maintain his position and reputation but always striving for more.

Career
Stewart was born in Preston, Lancashire. After beginning his career with Blackburn Rovers, he moved to AFC Bournemouth in 1999. He played regularly until 2002–03 season. Since 2005, he has made a number more first team appearances. During the 2007–08 season he made a total of 21 appearances in all competitions, though he was released at the end of the season.

Stewart signed a one-year contract with Conference South side Dorchester Town in August 2008. He has also joined the AFC Bournemouth Community Sports Trust as a community coach for school children in the local area.

On 30 September 2010, Stewart joined Conference South side Welling United.

On 14 January 2011, Stewart joined League One side Yeovil Town as a player-goalkeeping coach. After Yeovil's on loan goalkeeper Marek Štěch was called up to the Czech Republic national under-21 football team in November 2011, Stewart made his Yeovil debut in the FA Cup against Hereford United. He kept a clean sheet, as Yeovil won 3–0. Stewart made a further three appearances for Yeovil that season. Stewart's next appearance came as a substitute for Štěch after just eight minutes, in Yeovil's first home league game in the Championship in August 2013 against Birmingham City. His next and final appearance for Yeovil came as a substitute for Artur Krysiak, on 28 February 2015, against Scunthorpe United, and saved former Yeovil striker Paddy Madden's penalty. Stewart left Yeovil after more than three years after the club's relegation to League Two at the end of the 2014–15 season, due to financial cutbacks.

Following his release from Yeovil, Stewart returned to Bournemouth to work with the club's academy and under 23's.

In August 2017, Stewart joined Southern League Premier Division side Weymouth on non-contract terms.

Career statistics

References

External links

1980 births
Living people
English footballers
Association football goalkeepers
Association football goalkeeping coaches
Blackburn Rovers F.C. players
AFC Bournemouth players
Dorchester Town F.C. players
Welling United F.C. players
Yeovil Town F.C. players
Weymouth F.C. players
English Football League players
National League (English football) players
Southern Football League players
Yeovil Town F.C. non-playing staff
AFC Bournemouth non-playing staff
Footballers from Preston, Lancashire